The House of Resti or Restić, was a Ragusan noble family. It was an old patrician family, originating in Dalmatia.

History 
In the 14th century, it was made up of two branches. In the beginning of the 15th century Ragusan nobility were present in Novo Brdo as merchants or mining lords; Resti were also present. After 1808, with the French occupation and division of the Ragusan nobility into two groups, the family joined the Salamancanists, along with the Bassegli, Benessa, Bonda, Buća, Giorgi, Bona, Gradi, Ragnina, and Tudisi, while Gondola, Palmotta, Proculo were Sorbonnists; the rest of Ragusan nobility had branches, more or less, in both groups.

Members
Vita de Resti
Michael de Resti (1389–1396), Ragusan merchant, active at Drijeva.
Michael de Resti (fl. 1420), procurator at the Bosnian court
Giunio Resti (1671–1735), historian.
Giunio Resti (1755–1814), politician, governor and writer

Annotations

References

Sources

Ragusan noble families